Antipodocottus megalops is a species of marine ray-finned fish belonging to the family Cottidae, the typical sculpins.

References
 
 Tony Ayling & Geoffrey Cox, Collins Guide to the Sea Fishes of New Zealand,  (William Collins Publishers Ltd, Auckland, New Zealand 1982) 

megalops
Endemic marine fish of New Zealand
Fish described in 1969
Taxa named by H. H. DeWitt